Agni Tirtham is one of the Tirthas of Rameswaram, Tamil Nadu, India. The beach east of Ramanathaswamy Temple is known by this name. This Tirtham is one of the most visited Tirthams of Rameswaram for a holy bath.

Faith & Beliefs 
The faith among pilgrims is that child-less
couples bathing in this Tirtham and offering
prayers to Lord Shiva at the temple would be
blessed with children.

New moon days and Full moon days are considered to be
the most auspicious bathing days here.

References in Literature 
References to this Tirtha is made in Sethu Puranam, Skanda Puranam, Narada Puranam.

See also 
 Tirthas
 Rameswaram
 Tirthas of Rameswaram
 Ramanathaswamy Temple, Rameswaram

Notes

References 

 

Hindu pilgrimage sites in India